North Elmham Castle, also known as North Elmham Bishops Castle and North Elmham Bishops Chapel, is a ruined castle in the village of North Elmham, in the county of Norfolk.

History

The castle was built on the site of the Anglo-Saxon cathedral of Elmham in the 11th century. It was the see of Herbert de Losinga, Bishop of Norwich.

On 29 December 1387 Henry le Despenser, Bishop of Norwich, obtained a licence to crenellate the church. He then fortified the structure into a double-moated castle.

The castle fell into disrepair during the 16th century, and by the 19th century nothing was visible above ground.

Present

English Heritage, which currently stewards the site, excavated it during the 1970s, revealing the earthworks and ruins. Remains of a kitchen hearth, arches, cathedral towers, and walls are all visible. Visitation of the ruins is free and open year-round. The castle is a grade I listed building and a scheduled monument.

Debate

There is debate over some of the ruins at the site. Though it is known for certain that part of the ruins are from the castle and 11th-century church, the building which stood there prior is in doubt. It was thought to have been the site of a Saxon cathedral built of stone and flint, and used as the seat of the bishops of East Anglia during the late Anglo-Saxon period until 1075. Architectural historians now believe that though an Anglo-Saxon church made of timber did exist on the site, the stone remains are actually of a Norman chapel built after the Norman invasion.

See also
Castles in Great Britain and Ireland
List of castles in England

References

External links

North Elmham Castle page on English Heritage website
The Mystery of the Two Elmhams

Castles in Norfolk
English Heritage sites in Norfolk
Ruins in Norfolk
Ruined castles in England
North Elmham